Manly B. Townsend (1803-1849) was an American politician and lawyer from Maine. Townsend served three single year terms (1844, 1845, 1848) in the Maine Senate. In 1845, he was the Senate President.

Townsend was born in Sidney, Maine and graduated from Waterville College. From 1831 to 1842, he practiced law in Calais, Maine and from 1842 until his death in 1849, he lived in the nearby town of Alexander.

References

1803 births
1849 deaths
Presidents of the Maine Senate
People from Kennebec County, Maine
Politicians from Calais, Maine
Maine lawyers
Colby College alumni
19th-century American politicians
19th-century American lawyers